Chen Chieh 陳傑 (born May 8, 1992 in Taichung) is a Taiwanese athlete specializing in the 400 meters hurdles. He represented his country at the 2012 Summer Olympics and the 2016 Summer Olympics without reaching the semifinals.

His personal best in the event is 48.92 seconds, set in Doha in 2019.

Competition record

1Disqualified in the final

References

1992 births
Living people
Sportspeople from Taichung
Taiwanese male hurdlers
Olympic athletes of Taiwan
Athletes (track and field) at the 2012 Summer Olympics
Athletes (track and field) at the 2016 Summer Olympics
Athletes (track and field) at the 2014 Asian Games
Athletes (track and field) at the 2018 Asian Games
Universiade medalists in athletics (track and field)
Universiade silver medalists for Chinese Taipei
Asian Games competitors for Chinese Taipei
Competitors at the 2011 Summer Universiade
Medalists at the 2017 Summer Universiade
Athletes (track and field) at the 2020 Summer Olympics
21st-century Taiwanese people